Dyschirius erwini is a species of ground beetle in the subfamily Scaritinae. It was described by Bulirsch in 2009.

References

eduardinus
Beetles described in 2009